Loyset Liédet (1420 – after 1479, or after 1484), was a Flemish  miniaturist and illuminator, running a workshop which may have been of some size. Although he was very successful, and patronized by the leading collectors of his day, his work does not attain the standards of his finest Flemish contemporaries, with whom he often collaborated on large commissions.

Biography
Liédet was a prolific artist coming from Hesdin in Artois. Between 1454 and 1460 he worked in Hesdin where he produced 55 thumbnails for La Fleur des Histoires by Jean Mansel, commissioned by Philip the Good of the House of Valois-Burgundy. He illustrated Royal Library of Belgium MS 9967, a copy of Jehan Wauquelin's edition of La Belle Hélène de Constantinople for Philip.

He also did some work for Charles the Bold. In his early work, he was influenced by Simon Marmion. After 1467 he was found in Bruges, where he was a member of the Guild of Saint Luke listed as an illuminator. In all probability he continued to work in Bruges until 1479.  Liédet was long thought to have died around 1479, the date of the last mention of him in the archives of Bruges. However recent research by Dominique Vanwijnsberghe in the archives of Lille shows that Liédet and his brother Huchon (or Husson) were still listed in the archives of that city in 1483 and 1484.

References

 Legaré Anne-Marie. Loyset Liedet: a new illuminated manuscript. In: Journal of Art, 1999, No. 126. pp. 36–49
 Bernard Bousmanne and Céline Van Hoorebeeck, The Book of Hours of Tavernier, a rare manuscript full of surprises Tides Tavernier: KBR, ms. IV 1290, led by Dominique Allard et al. – Brussels: King Baudouin Foundation,
 Maurice SMEYERS, Flemish Miniatures from the 8th to the mid-16th century, Davidsfonds Leuven, 1998, pp. 355 ff

1420 births
1479 deaths
Flemish artists
People from Pas-de-Calais
Manuscript illuminators
15th-century artists